Battle off Halifax may refer to:

 Battle off Halifax (1780)
 Battle off Halifax (1782)